Jesús Brahaman Sinisterra Arias or simply Jesús Sinisterra or Brahaman Sinisterra (born December 9, 1975) is a Colombian former footballer who played as a defensive midfielder. He spent one season in the Bundesliga with Arminia Bielefeld.

References

External links
 

Living people
1975 births
People from Quibdó
Association football midfielders
Colombian footballers
Colombia international footballers
Categoría Primera A players
Bundesliga players
2. Bundesliga players
América de Cali footballers
Deportivo Pereira footballers
Deportes Quindío footballers
Millonarios F.C. players
Club Almagro players
Club Atlético Banfield footballers
Arminia Bielefeld players
SV Eintracht Trier 05 players
Rot Weiss Ahlen players
Nueva Chicago footballers
Deportes Tolima footballers
Deportivo Pasto footballers
Boyacá Chicó F.C. footballers
Envigado F.C. players
Colombian expatriate footballers
Colombian expatriate sportspeople in Argentina
Expatriate footballers in Argentina
Expatriate footballers in Germany
Sportspeople from Chocó Department